Rama Cay is an island in the Bluefields Lagoon on the eastern coast of Nicaragua. During the 17th or 18th century, the more powerful Miskito awarded the island to the Rama people in recognition of their assistance in fighting off the Terraba Indians.

When a Moravian mission was established on the island in 1857, the Rama began what would become a general shift to using an English-based creole language in lieu of their traditional Rama language.

Caribbean islands of Nicaragua
History of the Nicaragua Province of the Moravian Church
South Caribbean Coast Autonomous Region
Populated places in Nicaragua
Islands of Nicaragua